John Smith (February 18, 1894 – November 8, 1977) was an Ontario businessman and political figure. He represented Lincoln in the House of Commons of Canada as a Progressive Conservative member from 1957 to 1962.

He was born in Scotland in 1894, the son of Daniel Smith and Annie Douglas, and grew up there. Smith was a building contractor in St. Catharines. He served in the Canadian Army during World War I. In 1924, he married Jean Wood. Smith served on the city council of St. Catharines and was mayor from 1954 to 1957. He was defeated by James McNulty in the 1962 general election. He was a member of the Freemasons.

References 
 Canadian Parliamentary Guide 1962, P.G. Normandin

External links
 

1894 births
1977 deaths
Members of the House of Commons of Canada from Ontario
Progressive Conservative Party of Canada MPs
British emigrants to Canada
Mayors of St. Catharines